Kherson is a port city of Ukraine that serves as the administrative centre of Kherson Oblast. Located on the Black Sea and on the Dnieper River, Kherson is the home of a major ship-building industry and is a regional economic centre. It has a population of 

From March to November 2022, the city was occupied by Russian forces during their invasion of Ukraine. Ukrainian forces recaptured the city on 11 November 2022.

Etymology
As the first new settlement in the "Greek project" of Empress Catherine and her favorite Grigory Potemkin, it was named after the Heraclea Pontic colony of Chersonesus, which was located on the Crimean Peninsula, means 'peninsular shore'.

History

Russian Empire era (1783–1917) 
The city was founded by decree of Catherine the Great on 18 June 1778 on the high bank of the Dnieper as a central fortress of the Black Sea Fleet after the Russian annexation of the territory in 1774. The city was established in place of the Russian-built fort or sconce "Saint Alexander" which existed at least since 1737 and also served as one of administrative centers of the Zaporizhian Sich and run by local Cossacks. The fort was built during the Russo-Turkish War and improved some 30 years later. Before 1737 in place of Kherson and Fort St.Alexandre, older maps show a settlement of Bilschowisce which carries Ukrainian-like transliteration.

1783 saw the city granted the rights of a district town and the opening of a local shipyard where the hulls of the Russian Black Sea fleet were laid. Within a year the Kherson Shipping Company began operations. By the end of the 18th century, the port had established trade with France, Italy, Spain and other European countries. Between 1783–1793 Poland's maritime trade via the Black Sea was conducted through Kherson by the Kompania Handlowa Polska. In 1791, Potemkin was buried in the newly built St. Catherine's Cathedral. In 1803 the city became the capital of the Kherson Governorate.

Industry, beginning with breweries, tanneries and other food and agricultural processing, developed from the 1850s.

In 1897 the population of the city was 59,076 of which, on the basis of their first language, almost half were recorded as Great Russian, 30% as Jewish, and 20% Ukrainian.

During the revolution of 1905 there were workers' strikes and an army mutiny (an armed demonstration by soldiers of the 10th Disciplinary Battalion) in the city.

Soviet era (1917–1991)

Early Bolshevik period 
In the Russian Constituent Assembly election held in November 1917—the first and last free election in Kherson for 70 years—Bolsheviks who had seized power in Petrograd and Moscow received just 13.2 percent of the vote in the Governorate. The largest electoral bloc in the district, with 43 percent of the vote, was an alliance of Ukrainian Socialist Revolutionaries (SRs), Russian Socialist Revolutionaries and the United Jewish Socialist Workers Party.

The Bolsheviks dissolved SR-dominated Assembly after its first sitting, and proceeded to force from Kiev the Central Council of Ukraine (Tsentralna Rada) whose response to the Leninist coup had been to proclaim the independence of the Ukrainian People's Republic (UPR). But, before the Bolsheviks could secure Kherson, they were obliged to cede the region under the terms of the March 1918 Treaty of Brest-Litovsk to the German and Austrian controlled Ukrainian State. After the withdrawal of German and Austrian forces in November 1918, the efforts of the UPR (the Petluirites) to assert authority were frustrated by a French-led Allied intervention which occupied Kherson in January 1919.

In March 1919, the Green Army of local warlord Otaman Nykyfor Hryhoriv ousted the French and Greek garrison and precipitated the Allied evacuation from Odesa. In July, the Bolsheviks defeated Hryhoriv who had called upon the Ukrainian people to rise against the "Communist imposters" and their "Jewish commissars," and had perpetrated pogroms, including in the Kherson region. Kherson itself was occupied by the counter-revolutionary Whites before finally falling to the Bolshevik Red Army in February 1920. In 1922 the city and region was formally incorporated into the Ukrainian SSR a constituent republic of the Soviet Union.

The population was radically reduced from 75,000 to 41,000 by the famine of 1921–3, but then rose steadily, reaching 97,200 in 1939. In 1940, the city was one of the sites of executions of Polish officers and intelligentsia committed by the Soviets as part of the Katyn massacre.

World War II and post-War period 
Further devastation and population loss resulted from the German occupation during the Second World War. The German occupation, which lasted from August 1941 to March 1944, contended with both Soviet and Ukrainian nationalist (OUN) underground cells. The Kherson district leadership of the OUN was headed by Bogdan Bandera (brother of OUN leader Stepan Bandera). The Germans operated a Nazi prison and the Stalag 370 prisoner-of-war camp in the city.

In the post-war decades, which saw substantial industrial growth, the population more than doubled, reaching 261,000 by 1970. The new factories, including the Comintern Shipbuilding and Repairs Complex, the Kuibyshev Ship Repair Complex, and the Kherson Cotton Textile Manufacturing Complex (one of the largest textile plants in the Soviet Union), and Kherson's growing grain-exporting port, drew in labour from the Ukrainian countryside. This changed the city's ethnic composition, increasing the Ukrainian share from 36% in 1926 to 63% in 1959, while reducing the Russian share from 36 to 29%. The Jewish population never recovered from the Holocaust visited by the Germans: accounting for 26% of residents in 1926, their number had fallen to just 6% in 1959.

In independent Ukraine 
With a turnout of 83.4% of eligible voters, 90.1% of the votes cast in Kherson Oblast affirmed Ukrainian independence in the national referendum of 1 December 1991. With the collapse of the Soviet Union, Kherson and its industries experienced severe dislocation. Over the following three decades, the population of both the city and the region declined, reflecting both a significant excess of  deaths over live births and persistent net-emigration from the area.

The 2014 pro-Russian unrest in eastern and southern Ukraine was marked in Kherson by a small demonstration of some 400 persons. Following Russian occupation of Crimea in 2014, Kherson housed the office of the Ukrainian President's representative in Crimea.

In July 2020, as part of the general administrative reform of Ukraine, the Kherson Municipality was merged as an urban hromada into newly established Kherson Raion, one of five raions in the Kherson Oblast of which the city remained the administrative centre.

A "City Profile", part of the SCORE (Social Cohesion and Reconciliation) Ukraine 2021 project funded by USAID, the United Nations Development Programme (UNDP), and the European Union, concluded that "more than 80% of citizens in Kherson city feel their locality is a good place to live, work, and raise a family". This was despite a low level of trust in the local authorities in whom corruption was perceived to be high. It also found that, while more inclined to express support for co-operation with Russia than for membership of the EU, "citizens in Kherson feel attached to their Ukrainian identity".

2020 local election 
In the last free elections before the 2022 Russian invasion, the Ukrainian local elections held on 25 October 2020, the results of Kherson City Council elections were as follows:

The parties widely perceived as pro-Russian, and Euro-skeptic, Opposition Platform, Volodymyr Saldo Bloc, and Party of Shariy (3.89%) had a combined vote of just over 30% of the total, and secured 20 out of the 54 seats on the city council. In the wake of the invasion, the Opposition Platform and the Party of Shariy were banned by the National Security Council for alleged ties to the Kremlin.

The Volodymyr Saldo Bloc dissolved; its deputies in Kyiv joined the newly formed faction "Support to the programs of the President of Ukraine". From 26 April 2022,  Volodymyr Saldo himself, who had been mayor of Kherson from 2002 to 2012, went on to serve the Russian occupiers, as head of the Kherson military–civilian administration.

2022 Russian occupation 

Kherson witnessed heavy fighting in the first days of the 2022 Russian invasion of Ukraine (Kherson offensive). As of 2 March the city was under Russian control, and as early as 8 March the Russian FSB was reported to be tasked with crushing resistance.

Under the Russian occupation, locals continued to stage street protests against the invading army's presence and in support of the unity of Ukraine. According to the Ukrainian government, the Russian military sought to create a puppet Kherson People's Republic in the style of the Russian-backed separatist polities in the Donbas region and tried to coerce local councillors into endorsing the move, detaining those activists and officials who opposed their design.

By 26 April 2022, Russian troops had taken over the city's administration headquarters and had appointed both a new mayor, former KGB agent Alexander Kobets, and ex-mayor Volodymyr Saldo as a new civilian-military regional administrator. The next day, Ukraine's Prosecutor General said that troops used tear gas and stun grenades to disperse a further pro-Ukraine rally in the city centre. In an indication of an intended split from Ukraine, on the 28th the new administration announced that from May it would switch the region's payments to the Russian ruble. Citing unnamed reports about alleged discrimination of Russian speakers, its deputy head, Kirill Stremousov said that "reintegrating the Kherson region back into a Nazi Ukraine is out of the question".

On 30 May the Russian-backed occupation authority in Kherson claimed that it had started exporting last year's grain from Kherson to Russia. They would also be working on exporting sunflower seeds.

On 6 June it was reported by the Ukrainian mayor of Kherson, Ihor Kolykhaiev, that the occupiers had conducted a meeting of more than 70 Russian sympathizers aimed at conducting a referendum on the region integrating the occupied areas into Russia. His sources told him that the dates discussed were two: in September or at the end of 2022. As a Russian election was going to take place on 11 September, the Kherson vote would be scheduled to coincide with that day. An elected official in Russia named Igor Kastyukevich had discussed this plan on 7 June, following the visit to Kherson of Sergei Kiriyenko, the deputy chief of staff of the Russian presidential administration.

 

By June, the occupiers were switching Ukrainian schools to their educational curriculum and Russian SIM cards were on the market. Kolykhaiev witnessed the occupiers distributing Russian passports. A cafe frequented by the occupiers was bombed on 7 June and at least four people were injured. Stremousov said on 29 June that "The Kherson region will decide to join the Russian Federation and become a full-fledged subject as one unified state." On the same visit, Kiriyenko spoke at the United Russia party's humanitarian aid center in Kherson: "The Kherson region's admission into Russia will be complete, similar to Crimea,” recalling the 2014 Crimean status referendum.

On 18 June it was announced that Russian FSB officers were in the process of moving from hotels to apartments that had been vacated by Ukrainians.

In late June the first Russian bank opened in Kherson, while Oleksii Kovalov, an ex-member of the Ukrainian Servant of the People party, survived an assassination attempt after he had been appointed vice-president.

On 24 June Dmytro Savluchenko, who led the Directorate for Family, Youth, and Sports of the Russian occupation administration, was assassinated by the explosion of a car bomb.

On 29 June the Ukrainian mayor of Kherson, Kolykhaiev, was detained by Russian security forces.

On 5 July, Volodymyr Saldo announced that the former deputy head of government in the Russian exclave of Kaliningrad Sergei Yeliseyev, a graduate of the FSB Academy, was to assume the presidency of the oblast.

On 28 August 2022 the vice-president of the occupation administration (Kovalev) was found shot dead inside his own apartment in Zaliznyi Port. His wife was stabbed in the same attack and she died later in the hospital.

On 30 September 2022, the Russian Federation claimed to have annexed Kherson Oblast. The United Nations General Assembly condemned the proclaimed annexations with a vote of 143-5.

Russian forces were ordered to withdraw from the city by defence minister Sergei Shoigu and regroup on the eastern side of the Dnieper on 9 November 2022. Ukrainian officials claimed that Russian troops were destroying bridges connecting the city to the other bank of the river. On 11 November, Ukraine announced that its forces had entered the city following the Russian withdrawal.

Before retreating, the Russian army destroyed infrastructure facilities of the city (communications, water, heat, electricity, TV tower), looted two main museums ( and the Art Museum), transporting their items to Crimean museums, and took away several monuments to historical figures.

Demographics

Ethnicity
As of Ukrainian National Census in 2001, the ethnic groups living within Kherson included:
Ukrainians – 76.6%
Russians – 20.0%
Other – 3.4%

Languages

Administrative divisions
There are three city raions.

Suvorov Raion, central and oldest district of the city, named after the Russian General Suvorov. Includes departments: Tavrіjs'kij, Pіvnіchnij and Mlini.
Dnipro Raion, named after the Dnieper river. Includes departments: HBK, Tekstilny, Sklotara, Slobіdka, Voyenka, Skhіdny.
Korabelny Raion. Includes departments: Shumensky, Korabel, Zabalka, Sukharne, Zhitloselishche, Selishche — 4, Selishche — 5.

Climate
Under the Köppen climate classification, Kherson has a humid continental climate (Dfa).

Transport

Ports
Kherson has both a seaport, Port of Kherson and a river port, Kherson River Port.

Rail

Kherson is connected to the national railroad network of Ukraine. There are daily long-distance services to Kyiv, Lviv and other cities.

Air
Kherson is served by Kherson International Airport. It operates a 2,500 x 42-meter concrete runway, accommodating Boeing 737, Airbus 319/320 aircraft, and helicopters of all series.

Education

There are 77 high schools as well as 5 colleges. There are 15 institutions of higher education, including: 

Kherson State University of Agriculture
Kherson State University
Kherson National Technical University
International University of Business and Law
The documentary Dixie Land was filmed at a music school in Kherson.

Main sights

The Church of St. Catherine – was built in the 1780s, supposedly to Ivan Starov's designs, and contains the tomb of Prince Grigory Potemkin.
Jewish cemetery – Kherson has a large Jewish community which was established in the mid-nineteenth century. 
Kherson TV Tower 
Adziogol Lighthouse, a hyperboloid structure designed by Vladimir Shukhov in 1911
 The Kherson Art Museum has a collection of icons, and Ukrainian and Russian paintings and sculptures. Particularly noteworthy are Portrait of a Woman (1883) by Konstantin Makovsky; The Tempest is Coming by Ivan Aivazovsky; Sunset by Alexei Savrasov; Cattle Yard in Abramtsevo by Vasily Polenov; At the Stone by Ivan Kramskoi; The Charioteer, by Peter Clodt von Jürgensburg (sculptor); Prince Svyatoslav by Eugene Lanceray (sculptor); Mephistopheles by Mark Antokolsky (sculptor); Near the Monastery by German painter August von Bayer (1859); Oaks (1956); Moloditsya (1938) and Still Life with the Blue Broom (1930), by Oleksii Shovkunenko (born in Kherson).

Notable people

Grigory Adamov (1886–1945), Soviet science fiction writer
Georgy Arbatov (1923–2010), Soviet and Russian political scientist.
Vladimir Baranov-Rossine (1888–1944), Ukrainian/Russian/French painter, avant-garde artist and inventor.
Max Barskih (born 1990), Ukrainian singer and songwriter. 
Stefania Berlinerblau (1852–1921), American anatomist and physician, investigated blood circulation
Maximilian Bern (1849–1923), German writer and editor.
Sergei Bondarchuk (1920–1994), Soviet and Russian actor, film director, and screenwriter 
Lev Davidovitch Bronstein (1879–1940), better known as Leon Trotsky, Bolshevik revolutionary and Marxist theorist, was born in the village of Bereslavka, Kherson Governorate.
Artem Datsyshyn (1979–2022), Ukrainian ballet dancer and soloist
Ivan Gannibal (1735–1801), eminent Russian military leader and a founder of the city
Sergei Garmash (born 1958), Soviet and Russian film and stage actor.
Yefim Golïshev (1897–1970), painter and composer associated with the Dada movement in Berlin.
Nikolai Grinko (1920–1989), Soviet and Ukrainian actor
Kateryna Handziuk (1985–2018), Ukrainian civil rights and anti-corruption activist 
John Howard (1726–1790), English prison reformer; he died of typhus whilst in Kherson.
Mircea Ionescu-Quintus (1917–2017), Romanian politician, writer and jurist
Yurii Kerpatenko (1976–2022), Ukrainian conductor 
Ihor Kolykhaiev (born 1971), Ukrainian politician and entrepreneur, Mayor of Kherson since 2020
Samuel Maykapar (1867–1938), Russian romantic composer, pianist and professor of music 
Yuriy Odarchenko (born 1960),a politician, Governor of Kherson Oblast since 2014
Nicholas Perry (born 1992), social media personality, known online as Nikocado Avocado
Sergei Polunin (born 1989), Russian ballet dancer, actor and model.
Prince Grigory Potemkin (1739–1791), military leader, statesman and nobleman; a founder of the city.
Salomon Rosenblum (1873–1925), later known as Sidney Reilly, a secret agent, adventurer and playboy, employed by the British Secret Intelligence Service; may have inspired spy character, James Bond.
Nissan Rilov (1922–2007), former soldier, Israeli artist and supporter of Palestinians
Moshe Sharett (1894–1965), 2nd Prime Minister of Israel from 1953 to 1955
Viktor Petrovich Skarzhinsky (1787–1861), wealthy landowner; squadron commander in the Russian Patriotic War of 1812
Inna Shevchenko (born 1990), Ukrainian feminist and leader of the women's movement FEMEN
Sergei Stanishev (born 1966), Bulgarian politician, 49th Prime Minister of Bulgaria
Prince Alexander Suvorov (1730–1800), Russian general; a founder of the city.
Svitlana Tarabarova (born 1990), Ukrainian singer, songwriter, music producer and actress.
Mikhail Yemtsev (1930–2003), Soviet and Russian science fiction writer

Sport 
Anastasiia Chetverikova (born 1998), sprint canoeist, team silver medallist at the 2020 Summer Olympics
Inna Gaponenko (born 1976), chess player, International Master & Woman Grandmaster.
Oleksandr Holovko (born 1972), former footballer with 414 club caps and 58 for Ukraine
Pavlo Ishchenko (born 1992), Ukrainian-Israeli boxer
Oleksandr Karavayev (born 1992), footballer with over 250 club caps and 45 for Ukraine
Yevhen Kucherevskyi (1941–2006), Ukrainian football coach of Dnipro Dnipropetrovsk
Larisa Latynina (born 1934), Soviet gymnast, has won nine Olympic gold medals
Tatiana Lysenko (born 1975), Soviet and Ukrainian gymnast, two gold and a bronze medal at the 1992 Summer Olympics
Yuriy Maksymov (born 1968), football coach and former midfielder with 384 club caps and 27 for Ukraine.
Yuri Nikitin (born 1978), gymnast and gold medallist at the 2004 Summer Olympics
Sergei Postrekhin (born 1957), sprint canoer, gold and silver medallist at the 1980 Summer Olympics 
Serhiy Tretyak (born 1963), retired Ukrainian footballer with over 500 club caps
David Tyshler (1927–2014), Ukrainian/Soviet fencer, two gold and a bronze medal at the 1956 Summer Olympics
Roman Vintov (born 1978), former Russian/Ukrainian footballer with over 460 club caps

Twin cities
 Zalaegerszeg, Hungary
 Shumen, Bulgaria
 Izmit, Turkey
 Bizerte, Tunisia

Notes

References

External links

 
 
Pictures of Kherson 
Kherson city administration website 
Kherson patriots 
Kherson info&shopping 
Kherson Photos 
The murder of the Jews of Kherson during World War II, at Yad Vashem website.

 
Cities in Kherson Oblast
Port cities and towns in Ukraine
Port cities of the Black Sea
Cities of regional significance in Ukraine
Populated places on the Dnieper in Ukraine
Oblast centers in Ukraine
Populated places established in 1778
1778 establishments in the Russian Empire
Populated places established in the Russian Empire
Khersonsky Uyezd
Holocaust locations in Ukraine